Isocoma acradenia is a North American species of flowering plant in the family Asteraceae known by the common name alkali goldenbush.

It is native to the Southwestern United States (California, Nevada, Utah, Arizona) and northwestern Mexico (Sonora, Baja California). It grows in arid, sandy areas, particularly mineral-rich areas such as alkali flats and gypsum soils.

Description
It produces erect, branching stems which are a shiny pale yellowish white, aging to a yellow-gray.

They are gray-green and age to pale gray or tan.

The inflorescences along the top parts of the stem branches are clusters of four or five flower heads. Each head is a capsule encased in bumpy, glandular greenish phyllaries bearing many golden yellow disc florets at its mouth. Each disc floret is somewhat cylindrical and protruding.

The fruit is an achene a few millimeters long, with a yellowish pappus adding another few millimeters.

Varieties
Isocoma acradenia var. acradenia - Salt scrub, often with creosote - Arizona, California, Nevada, Sonora
Isocoma acradenia var. bracteosa (Greene) G. L. Nesom - salt flats - southern Central Valley in California
Isocoma acradenia var. eremophila (Greene) G. L. Nesom - sandy soils, dunes, etc. - Arizona, California, Nevada, Utah, Baja California, Sonora).

References

External links
Calflora Database: Isocoma acradenia (Alkali goldenbush,  Desert isocoma)
Jepson Manual eFlora (TJM2) treatment of Isocoma acradenia
UC CalPhotos gallery − Isocoma acradenia

acradenia
Flora of the Southwestern United States
Flora of Northwestern Mexico
Flora of California
Flora of the California desert regions
Flora of the Sonoran Deserts
Natural history of the California chaparral and woodlands
Natural history of the Colorado Desert
Natural history of the Mojave Desert
Plants described in 1883
Taxa named by Edward Lee Greene
Flora without expected TNC conservation status